Drifter is the debut album by country music singer Sylvia. It features the top ten singles "Heart on the Mend", "Tumbleweed", "It Don't Hurt to Dream", "The Matador", and the number-one single, "Drifter". The album reached No. 10 on the Billboard Top Country Albums chart.

It offers a traditional country feel, using fiddles and steel guitars.

Track listing

Side one
"Drifter" (Don Pfrimmer, Archie Jordan) — 2:25
"Tumbleweed" (Kye Fleming, Dennis Morgan) — 3:11
"I'm Going with Him"	(Fleming, Morgan) — 3:19
"It Don't Hurt to Dream" (Charles Quillen, D. Pate, J. Pate) — 2:39
"The Matador" (Bob Morris, Pfrimmer) — 3:15

Side two
"Whippoorwill" (Morgan, Fleming) — 3:23
"Heart on the Mend" (Fleming, Morgan) — 3:04
"Cry Baby Cry" (Fleming, Morgan) — 2:39
"Missin' You" (Fleming, Morgan) — 2:41
"Rainbow Rider" (Klang) — 2:52

Personnel
Sylvia - lead vocals
Jimmy Capps, Dennis Morgan, Dale Sellers, Paul Worley - acoustic guitar
Jim Glaser, The Jordanaires, Louis Dean Nunley, The Lea Jane Singers, Gordon Stoker, Hurshel Winginton - backing vocals
Mike Leech - bass guitar
Gene Christman, Larrie Londin, Buster Phillips - drums
Bruce Dees, Fred Newell, Brent Rowan, Billy Sanford - electric guitar
Tommy Williams - fiddle
David Briggs, Bobby Emmons, Bobby Ogdin - piano
John Hughey - steel guitar
The Sheldon Kurland Strings - strings (tracks 1,3,4,5,10)
Bergen White - string arrangements

Chart performance

References

1981 debut albums
Sylvia (singer) albums
RCA Records albums
Albums produced by Tom Collins (record producer)